The Hanyang M1935 bayonet is a bayonet used on the Chinese Chiang Kai-Shek rifle. It is based on the Mauser S84/98 III bayonet used on German Gewehr 98 rifles and derivatives and utilizes the same Mauser bayonet lug pattern.

References

Bayonets
Chinese melee weapons
Weapons of the Republic of China
World War II infantry weapons of China